A cardiac stress test (also referred to as a cardiac diagnostic test, cardiopulmonary exercise test, or abbreviated CPX test) is a cardiological test that measures the heart's ability to respond to external stress in a controlled clinical environment. The stress response is induced by exercise or by intravenous pharmacological stimulation.

Cardiac stress tests compare the coronary circulation while the patient is at rest with the same patient's circulation during maximum cardiac exertion, showing any abnormal blood flow to the myocardium (heart muscle tissue). The results can be interpreted as a reflection on the general physical condition of the test patient. This test can be used to diagnose coronary artery disease (also known as ischemic heart disease) and assess patient prognosis after a myocardial infarction (heart attack).

Exercise-induced stressors are most commonly either exercise on a treadmill or pedalling a stationary exercise bicycle ergometer. The level of stress is progressively increased by raising the difficulty (steepness of the slope on a treadmill or resistance on an ergometer) and speed. People who cannot use their legs may exercise with a bicycle-like crank that they turn with their arms, or may be given a medication to induce cardiac stress. Once the stress test is completed, the patient generally is advised to not suddenly stop activity but to slowly decrease the intensity of the exercise over the course of several minutes.

The test administrator or attending physician examines the symptoms and blood pressure response. To measure the heart's response to the stress the patient may be connected to an electrocardiogram (ECG); in this case the test is most commonly called a cardiac stress test but is known by other names, such as exercise testing, stress testing treadmills, exercise tolerance test, stress test or stress test ECG. Alternatively a stress test may use an echocardiogram for ultrasonic imaging of the heart (in which case the test is called an echocardiography stress test or stress echo), or a gamma camera to image radioisotopes injected into the bloodstream (called a nuclear stress test).

Stress echocardiography 
A stress test may be accompanied by echocardiography. The echocardiography is performed both before and after the exercise so that structural differences can be compared.

A resting echocardiogram is obtained prior to stress. The images obtained are similar to the ones obtained during a full surface echocardiogram, commonly referred to as transthoracic echocardiogram. The patient is subjected to stress in the form of exercise or chemically (usually dobutamine). After the target heart rate is achieved, 'stress' echocardiogram images are obtained. The two echocardiogram images are then compared to assess for any abnormalities in wall motion of the heart. This is used to detect obstructive coronary artery disease.

Cardiopulmonary exercise test 

While also measuring breathing gases (e.g. O2, VO2), the test is often referred to as a cardiopulmonary exercise test (CPET).
Common indications for a cardiopulmonary exercise test is:
Evaluation of dyspnea.
Work up before heart transplantation.
Prognosis and risk assessment of heart failure patients.
The test is also common in sport science for measuring athlete's VO2 max.

Nuclear stress test 
A nuclear stress test uses a gamma camera to image radioisotopes injected into the bloodstream. The best known example  is myocardial perfusion imaging. Typically, a radiotracer (Tc-99 sestamibi, Myoview or thallous chloride 201) may be injected during the test. After a suitable waiting period to ensure proper distribution of the radiotracer, scans are acquired with a gamma camera to capture images of the blood flow. Scans acquired before and after exercise are examined to assess the state of the coronary arteries of the patient.

Showing the relative amounts of radioisotope within the heart muscle, the nuclear stress tests more accurately identify regional areas of reduced blood flow.

Stress and potential cardiac damage from exercise during the test is a problem in patients with ECG abnormalities at rest or in patients with severe motor disability. Pharmacological stimulation from vasodilators such as dipyridamole or adenosine, or positive chronotropic agents such as dobutamine can be used. Testing personnel can include a cardiac radiologist, a nuclear medicine physician, a nuclear medicine technologist, a cardiology technologist, a cardiologist, and/or a nurse.

The typical dose of radiation received during this procedure can range from 9.4 to 40.7 millisieverts.

Function 

The American Heart Association recommends ECG treadmill testing as the first choice for patients with medium risk of coronary heart disease according to risk factors of smoking, family history of coronary artery stenosis, hypertension, diabetes and high cholesterol. In 2013, in its "Exercise Standards for Testing and Training", the AHA indicated that high frequency QRS analysis during ECG treadmill test have useful test performance for detection of coronary heart disease.
 Perfusion stress test (with 99mTc labelled sestamibi) is appropriate for select patients, especially those with an abnormal resting electrocardiogram.
 Intracoronary ultrasound or angiogram can provide more information at the risk of complications associated with cardiac catheterization.

Diagnostic value 
The common approach for stress testing by American College of Cardiology and American Heart Association indicates the following:
 Treadmill test: sensitivity 73-90%, specificity 50-74% (modified Bruce protocol)
 Nuclear test: sensitivity 81%, specificity 85-95%

(Sensitivity is the percentage of people with the condition who are correctly identified by the test as having the condition; specificity is the percentage of people without the condition are correctly identified by the test as not having the condition).

To arrive at the patient's posttest likelihood of disease, interpretation of the stress test result requires integration of the patient's pretest likelihood with the test's sensitivity and specificity. This approach, first described by Diamond and Forrester in the 1970s, results in an estimate of the patient's post-test likelihood of disease.

The value of stress tests has always been recognized as limited in assessing heart disease such as atherosclerosis, a condition which mainly produces wall thickening and enlargement of the arteries. This is because the stress test compares the patient's coronary flow status before and after exercise and is suitable to detecting specific areas of ischemia and lumen narrowing, not a generalized arterial thickening.

According to American Heart Association data, about 65% of men and 47% of women present with a heart attack or sudden cardiac arrest as their first symptom of cardiovascular disease. Stress tests, carried out shortly before these events, are not relevant to the prediction of infarction in the majority of individuals tested. Over the past two decades, better methods have been developed to identify atherosclerotic disease before it becomes symptomatic. These detection methods include anatomical and physiological methods.
 Examples of anatomical methods
 CT coronary calcium score
 Coronary CT angiography
 Intima-media thickness (IMT)
 Intravascular ultrasound (IVUS)

 Examples of physiological methods
 Lipoprotein analysis
 HbA1c
 Hs-CRP
 Homocysteine

The anatomic methods directly measure some aspects of the actual process of atherosclerosis itself and therefore offer the possibility of early diagnosis but are often more expensive and may be invasive (in the case of IVUS, for example). The physiological methods are often less expensive and safer but are not able to quantify the current status of the disease or directly track progression.

Contraindications and termination conditions 
Stress cardiac imaging is not recommended for asymptomatic, low-risk patients as part of their routine care. Some estimates show that such screening accounts for 45% of cardiac stress imaging, and evidence does not show that this results in better outcomes for patients. Unless high-risk markers are present, such as diabetes in patients aged over 40, peripheral arterial disease; or a risk of coronary heart disease greater than 2 percent yearly, most health societies do not recommend the test as a routine procedure.

Absolute contraindications to cardiac stress test include:
 Acute myocardial infarction within 48 hours
 Unstable angina not yet stabilized with medical therapy
 Uncontrolled cardiac arrhythmia, which may have significant hemodynamic responses (e.g. ventricular tachycardia)
 Severe symptomatic aortic stenosis, aortic dissection, pulmonary embolism, and pericarditis
 Multivessel coronary artery diseases that have a high risk of producing an acute myocardial infarction
 Decompensated or inadequately controlled congestive heart failure
 Uncontrolled hypertension (blood pressure>200/110mm Hg)
 Severe pulmonary hypertension
 Acute aortic dissection
 Acutely ill for any reason

Indications for termination:

A cardiac stress test should be terminated before completion under the following circumstances:

Absolute indications for termination include:
 Systolic blood pressure decreases by more than 10 mmHg with increase in work rate, or drops below baseline in the same position, with other evidence of ischemia.
 Increase in nervous system symptoms: Dizziness, ataxia or near syncope
 Moderate to severe anginal pain (above 3 on standard 4-point scale)
 Signs of poor perfusion, e.g. cyanosis or pallor
 Request of the test subject
 Technical difficulties (e.g. difficulties in measuring blood pressure or EGC)
 ST Segment elevation of more than 1 mm in aVR, V1 or non-Q wave leads
 Sustained ventricular tachycardia

Relative indications for termination include:
 Systolic blood pressure decreases by more than 10 mmHg with increase in work rate, or drops below baseline in the same position, without other evidence of ischemia.
 ST or QRS segment changes, e.g. more than 2 mm horizontal or downsloping ST segment depression in non-Q wave leads, or marked axis shift
 Arrhythmias other than sustained ventricular tachycardia e.g. Premature ventricular contractions, both multifocal or triplet; heart block; supraventricular tachycardia or bradyarrhythmias
 Intraventricular conduction delay or bundle branch block or that cannot be distinguished from ventricular tachycardia
 Increasing chest pain
 Fatigue, shortness of breath, wheezing, claudication or leg cramps
 Hypertensive response (systolic blood pressure > 250 mmHg or diastolic blood pressure > 115 mmHg)

Adverse effects 
Side effects from cardiac stress testing may include
 Palpitations, chest pain, myocardial infarction, shortness of breath, headache, nausea or fatigue.
 Adenosine and dipyridamole can cause mild hypotension.
 As the tracers used for this test are carcinogenic, frequent use of these tests carries a small risk of cancer.

Pharmacological agents 
Pharmacologic stress testing relies on coronary steal. Vasodilators are used to dilate coronary vessels, which causes increased blood velocity and flow rate in normal vessels and less of a response in stenotic vessels. This difference in response leads to a steal of flow and perfusion defects appear in cardiac nuclear scans or as ST-segment changes.

The choice of pharmacologic stress agents used in the test depends on factors such as potential drug interactions with other treatments and concomitant diseases.

Pharmacologic agents such as adenosine, Lexiscan (regadenoson), or dipyridamole is generally used when a patient cannot achieve adequate work level with treadmill exercise, or has poorly controlled hypertension or left bundle branch block. However, an exercise stress test may provide more information about exercise tolerance than a pharmacologic stress test.

Commonly used agents include:
 Vasodilators acting as adenosine receptor agonists, such as adenosine itself, and dipyridamole (brand name "Persantine"), which acts indirectly at the receptor.
 Regadenoson (brand name "Lexiscan"), which acts specifically at the adenosine A2A receptor, thus affecting the heart more than the lung.
 Dobutamine. The effects of beta-agonists such as dobutamine can be reversed by administering beta-blockers such as propranolol.

Lexiscan (Regadenoson) or Dobutamine is often used in patients with severe reactive airway disease (asthma or COPD) as adenosine and dipyridamole can cause acute exacerbation of these conditions. If the patient's Asthma is treated with an inhaler then it should be used as a pre-treatment prior to the injection of the pharmacologic stress agent. In addition, if the patient is actively wheezing then the physician should determine the benefits versus the risk to the patient of performing a stress test especially outside of a hospital setting. Caffeine is usually held 24 hours prior to an adenosine stress test, as it is a competitive antagonist of the A2A adenosine receptor and can attenuate the vasodilatory effects of adenosine.

Aminophylline may be used to attenuate severe and/or persistent adverse reactions to Adenosine and Lexiscan.

Limitations
The stress test does not detect:
 Atheroma
 Vulnerable plaques

The test has relatively high rates of false positives and false negatives compared with other clinical tests. Females in particular have a higher rate of false positives, which is theorized to be because on average they have smaller hearts.

Results 
 Increased spatial resolution allows a more sensitive detection of ischemia.
 Stress testing, even if made in time, is not able to guarantee the prevention of symptoms, fainting, or death. Stress testing, although more effective than a resting ECG at detecting heart function, is only able to detect certain cardiac properties.
 The detection of high-grade coronary artery stenosis by a cardiac stress test has been the key to recognizing people who have heart attacks since 1980. From 1960 to 1990, despite the success of stress testing to identify many who were at high risk of heart attack, the inability of this test to correctly identify many others is discussed in medical circles but unexplained.
 High degrees of coronary artery stenosis, which are detected by stress testing methods are often, though not always, responsible for recurrent symptoms of angina.
 Unstable atheroma produces "vulnerable plaques" hidden within the walls of coronary arteries which go undetected by this test.
 Limitation in blood flow to the left ventricle can lead to recurrent angina pectoris.

See also 
 Cardiac steal syndrome
 Duke Treadmill Score
 Harvard step test
 Metabolic equivalent
 Robert A. Bruce
 Wasserman 9-Panel Plot

References

External links 
 Preparing for the exercise stress test
  "A Simple Exercise Tolerance Test for Circulatory Efficiency with Standard Tables for Normal Individuals," American Journal of the Medical Sciences
  "Optimal Medical Therapy with or without PCI for Stable Coronary Disease," New England Journal of Medicine
 Stress test information from the American Heart Association
 Nuclear stress test information at NIH MedLine

Diagnostic cardiology
Nuclear medicine